Stephon Williams (born April 28, 1993) is an American former professional ice hockey goaltender. He was selected by the New York Islanders in the fourth round (106th overall) of the 2013 NHL Entry Draft.

Playing career
Williams played college hockey with the Minnesota State Mavericks in the NCAA Men's Division I WCHA conference. In his freshman year, Williams' outstanding play was rewarded with a selection to the 2012–13 All-WCHA First Team.

Upon completion of his junior campaign with the Mavericks, Williams turned professional by signing a two-year entry-level contract with the New York Islanders on April 2, 2015. He was assigned to AHL affiliate, the Bridgeport Sound Tigers to finish the 2014–15 season.

At the completion of his entry-level contract, Williams was not tendered a qualifying offer from the Islanders thus releasing him as a free agent. On September 13, 2017, Williams agreed to a one-year AHL contract with the San Jose Barracuda.

After three full professional seasons in North America, Williams opted to embark on a European career, signing a one-year deal with Slovakian club, HC '05 Banská Bystrica of the Slovak Extraliga on June 26, 2018.

Career statistics

Awards and honors

References

External links 
 

1993 births
Living people
HC '05 Banská Bystrica players
Allen Americans players
American men's ice hockey goaltenders
Bridgeport Sound Tigers players
Minnesota State Mavericks men's ice hockey players
Missouri Mavericks players
New York Islanders draft picks
Sportspeople from Fairbanks, Alaska
San Jose Barracuda players
Sioux Falls Stampede players
Waterloo Black Hawks players

Minnesota State University, Mankato alumni
Ice hockey people from Alaska
SC Bietigheim-Bissingen players
American expatriate ice hockey players in Germany
American expatriate ice hockey players in Slovakia